Florin Comănici is a Romanian sprint canoer who has been competing since the late 2000s. He won a silver medal in the C-4 1000 m event at the 2010 ICF Canoe Sprint World Championships in Poznań.

References
2010 ICF Canoe Sprint World Championships men's C-4 1000 m final results. – added 21 August 2010.
Romanialibera.ro article on the 2010 ICF Canoe Sprint World Championships.  – accessed 22 August 2010. 

Living people
Romanian male canoeists
Year of birth missing (living people)
ICF Canoe Sprint World Championships medalists in Canadian